is a former Japanese football player. He played for Japan national team.

Club career
Hosotani was born in Hyogo Prefecture on January 21, 1946. After graduating from Waseda University, he joined Mitsubishi Motors in 1969. The club won the league champions in 1969 Japan Soccer League and 1971 Emperor's Cup. In 1973, the club won Japan Soccer League and Emperor's Cup. In 1978, the club won all three major title in Japan; Japan Soccer League, JSL Cup and Emperor's Cup. He retired in 1978. He played 140 games and scored 58 goals in the league.

National team career
On July 13, 1978, when Hosotani was 32 years old, he debuted for the Japan national team against Iraq. He played four games and scored one goal for Japan that year.

Club statistics

National team statistics

References

External links
 
 Japan National Football Team Database

1946 births
Living people
Waseda University alumni
Association football people from Hyōgo Prefecture
Japanese footballers
Japan international footballers
Japan Soccer League players
Urawa Red Diamonds players
Association football forwards